Bevan Calvert (born in Sydney on 4 April 1986) is an Australian handball player who formerly played for THW Kiel.

Career 
He debuted on an international level in January 2005 and played for THW Kiel of Germany. In the past he has served as team captain of the Australia men's national handball team.

Honours 
 Handball-Bundesliga: 2020-21
 DHB-Supercup: 2020

Personal life 
He is of Filipino Australian ancestry.

References 

1986 births
Living people
Australian male handball players
Australian people of Filipino descent
Australian sportspeople of Asian descent
Sportspeople of Filipino descent